The Ponder Heart is a novella written by Eudora Welty and illustrated by Joe Krush, originally published in The New Yorker in 1953, and republished by Harcourt Brace in 1954. The plot of The Ponder Heart follows Daniel Ponder, a wealthy heir, and is told through the narration of Edna Earle Ponder, Daniel's niece. In 1956, the story was made into a Broadway play by Joseph Fields and Jerome Chodorov. Una Merkel won the Tony Award for Best Featured Actress in a Play for her portrayal of Edna Earle Ponder in the Broadway play.

Plot
The novella is set in fictional rural Clay County, Mississippi, home to the Ponders, the richest family in the county. Daniel Ponder, a "mildly retarded man" according to literary scholars, is the heir to his father Sam Ponder's wealth. As Daniel generously gives away his possessions, including a gas station and heirloom watches, his father and his niece, Edna Earle Ponder, try to save their family fortune by having Daniel institutionalized to a psychiatric hospital. When Sam instead of Daniel is institutionalized by accident, the two try to have Daniel marry Teacake Magee, an eligible widow. The marriage only lasts two months.  Daniel later marries 17-year-old Bonnie Dee Peacock, and Daniel's father dies of a heart attack when he hears of the proposal. Bonnie runs away, and later returns to Daniel's house. She dies mysteriously on a stormy night. The Peacocks, under the advice of district attorney Dorris Gladney, indict Daniel on murder charges. He convinces the judge he is innocent, and gives away the remainder of his riches to all present at the trial, including the Peacocks.

The novella is narrated through the perspective of Edna.

Adaptations
A play was adapted from The Ponder Heart, which ran on Broadway from February 16, 1956, to June 23, 1956. Portraying Edna Earle Ponder, Una Merkel won the Tony Award for Best Featured Actress in a Play for her performance, while Ben Edwards was nominated for a Tony Award for scenic design. The Public Broadcasting Service also adapted the novella to a television film directed by Martha Coolidge as a part of the Masterpiece series in October 2001. The Ponder Heart was also adapted as an opera by Alice Parker, which premiered in Jackson, Mississippi in 1982.

Reception
The story received generally positive review from critics; Welty scholar Pearl Amelia McHaney called The Ponder Heart the "most positively received of Welty's books". Charles Poore of the New York Times called the novel "a wonderful tragicomedy of good intentions in a durably sinful world".

References

Bibliography

External links

1953 American novels
American novels adapted into films
American novels adapted into plays
Novels adapted into operas
American novels adapted into television shows
Novels by Eudora Welty
Works originally published in The New Yorker
Novels set in Mississippi